Esther Raziel-Naor (29 November 1911 – 11 November 2002) was a Revisionist Zionist, Irgun leader and Israeli politician. She was the sister of fellow Irgun leader David Raziel.

Biography

Early life
Raziel was born in Smarhoń (now in Hrodna Voblast, Belarus) in 1911, a year after her brother, David. Her household spoke Hebrew, as her parents refused to speak the more common Yiddish. In 1914, her family immigrated to Eretz Israel, after her father was offered a Hebrew teacher’s position at the “Tachmoni” school in Tel Aviv. However, when World War I began, the family was deported by the Ottomans, along with other Russian nationals, to Egypt. She moved back to Russia and returned to Palestine in 1923, after an 8-year absence.

In 1932, she joined Betar and organized the "National Cells." In 1935, she completed the Levinsky Teachers Seminary in Tel Aviv and moved to Jerusalem to work as a teacher, but was fired after being caught wearing a Betar insignia. She returned to Tel Aviv and took a "Lieutenants" course.

Irgun activity

In 1936, as the Arab Revolt began, she joined her brother in the Irgun. She took a first aid course and in August she took part in a reprisal. In 1939 she became the first broadcaster of the Irgun's underground radio station, Kol Zion Halohemet, as well as a writer for Hamashkif, its newspaper. In 1943 she was selected to be a member of the Irgun's command structure.

On March 4, 1944, the police raided her parents' house and found the radio transmitter. She was arrested along with her husband, Yehuda Naor, and was jailed in Bethlehem (Yehuda was taken to Acre and later deported to Africa, where he stayed for four and a half years, until the establishment of the State of Israel). She was pregnant at the time of her arrest and on August 18, 1944, after a seven-month internment, she was released and gave birth shortly after. She was placed under house arrest and was frequently investigated.

On July 22, 1946, following the King David Hotel bombing, she was once again arrested and was sent to the Latrun detention camp, where she remained for several weeks. After her release she remained under strict surveillance and was prevented from continuing her underground activity.

State of Israel
After the United Nations Partition Plan for Palestine was accepted on November 29, 1947, she returned to Kol Zion. After the establishment of the State of Israel she was one of the founders of Herut, and was elected on its list as a member of the 1st through 7th Knessets. Throughout her 25-year service she was a member of the Knesset's Education and Culture Committee and the House Committee. In the election to the 8th Knesset she was replaced by Geula Cohen.

She died on November 11, 2002, and was buried in Jerusalem. Her son, Aryeh Naor, whose wife is Miriam Naor, the President of the Supreme Court of Israel, was cabinet secretary for both of Menachem Begin's governments.

References

External links

1911 births
2002 deaths
People from Smarhon’
People from Oshmyansky Uyezd
Belarusian Jews
Emigrants from the Russian Empire to the Ottoman Empire
Ashkenazi Jews in Mandatory Palestine
Israeli Ashkenazi Jews
Israeli people of Belarusian-Jewish descent
Irgun members
Women members of the Knesset
Herut politicians
Gahal politicians
Members of the 1st Knesset (1949–1951)
Members of the 2nd Knesset (1951–1955)
Members of the 3rd Knesset (1955–1959)
Members of the 4th Knesset (1959–1961)
Members of the 5th Knesset (1961–1965)
Members of the 6th Knesset (1965–1969)
Members of the 7th Knesset (1969–1974)
20th-century Israeli women politicians